Thierry Rabat (born 30 May 1962) is a retired French football defender.

References

1965 births
Living people
French footballers
SC Toulon players
Limoges FC players
Paris Saint-Germain F.C. players
RC Lens players
FC Martigues players
Lille OSC players
ES Troyes AC players
Association football defenders
Ligue 1 players
Ligue 2 players